George Wythe Baylor (1832–1916) was a Confederate cavalryman, a Texas lawman, and a representative of the Texas State Government. He rose to the rank of colonel in the Confederate States Army during the American Civil War. He afterwards commanded Texas rangers in hunting Indians in Texas and across the border into Mexico, often in pursuit of the Apache chief Victorio and his band.

Early life 
George Wythe Baylow was born at Fort Gibson, in the Cherokee Nation, Indian Territory, on August 24, 1832. His father, a United States Army surgeon, was Dr. John Walker Baylor, eldest son of Judge Walker Baylor, of Bourbon county, Kentucky, whose wife was Jane, a sister of Jesse Bledsoe, of Kentucky. His mother was Sophia Maria, of Baltimore, Maryland, her father being Henreich Weidner, of Hessen Cassel, Germany, and her mother being Marie Chartelle, of an old Hugenot family.

His father moved from Bourbon county, Kentucky, to Fort Gibson, with his young family, going down from Louisville to the mouth of the Arkansas river on a keel boat, and this boat was dragged up the river to Fort Gibson. His mother took along a lot of fruit trees, roses and plants.

His father dying when he was four years old, his mother, then on Second Creek, Mississippi, back of Natchez, went to Pine Bluff, Arkansas; then to Little Rock, and finally to Fort Gibson again. In December 1845, he came to Texas; stopped at Ross Prairie, Fayette county, and went to school for a while to Professor William Halsey at Rutersville, and afterwards was sent by his uncle, Judge R. E. B. Baylor, to Baylor University, at Independence, Texas, then under the control of Dr. Henry Graves.

He went from school to San Antonio, and, lured by the gold rush, left there in March 1854 for California, five months being required to make the trip. He remained in California five years, and, although brought out by the Democratic party in 1859 for the Legislature, he preferred to come back to Texas. Returning to San Antonio in May 1859, he left for Parker county.

In 1860 he commanded a company of rangers in what was known as the Buffalo Hunt, but the Indians gave them a wide berth, and three or four Indians were killed. There were some 300 men in the expedition. The campaign against Comanches lasted six weeks and was the first extended service which Baylor saw. On that occasion he was leader of a company of 33 frontiersmen.

Civil War 

The Civil War breaking out, he joined Captain Hamner's company at Weatherford on March 17, 1861, and was elected first lieutenant, the company being attached to Colonel John S. Ford's regiment of cavalry. He was sworn in as first lieutenant of said company in San Antonio in May 1861. His brother, John R. Baylor, was lieutenant colonel of the regiment. He went with his company to Fort Clark, and from there went to El Paso as his brother's adjutant. 

Shortly after his arrival in El Paso the first regiment of the Union Army he and his men were called upon to fight was that to which his father had been attached during his lifetime, the 7th Infantry, and he and his brother had relatives and a large number of friends in its ranks. Though there were 750 men in the Union forces and a little over 300 in those of the Confederates, after a short struggle the entire Union regiment was captured. 

From this time Baylor's advancement in rank was rapid. After being stationed for a short time at San Augustine Springs, in New Mexico (afterwards Cox's ranch), he received an appointment from General Albert Sidney Johnston as his chief aide-de-camp and went to join Johnston's staff at Bowling Green, Kentucky. He remained on Johnston's staff until the general was killed at Shiloh, and held his head in his dying moments.

After General Johnston's death Jefferson Davis promoted Baylor to the rank of major, with authority to raise a battalion of Texas rangers for service in the Confederate cause. The battalion was later increased to a regiment and Baylor's rank raised to that of colonel by President Davis's order. While the regiment was never raised, because of the coming of the close of the Civil War, Colonel Baylor retained his rank, and it was a dispute over this that led him to kill General John A. Wharton during a quarrel. Baylor was tried three times before he was finally acquitted after the war.

Texas rangers 
After the close of the war he lived in Galveston, Dallas and San Antonio, and in 1879 was sent out as second or junior lieutenant of company C (Harrington's company), Texas rangers, to El Paso, by Governor Roberts. This was just after Mexicans had murdered a number of Americans at San Elizario, El Paso county, and there was much excitement along the border. His first fight with the Apaches was on October 7, three weeks after he got to his post, when the Indians made a raid. One Mexican had been killed by the Indians and a party of Mexicans went along with the rangers in pursuit of them across the Rio Grande. Overtaking the band at 11 a.m., they fought with them until dark, killing three of their number. One horse killed was the rangers' total loss.

It was shortly after this that Baylor had his first experience with Victorio and his band of Apaches. The band had killed 33 of the citizens of the town of Carrisal or Carizal (near what is now Villa Ahumada) in the state of Chihuahua, Mexico. A party of 15 had gone out against the Indians, and had all been killed, and a relief party of 18 that had gone out in search of the first party had also been killed by the Apaches. The citizens of El Paso del Norte (now Juarez) organized and asked Baylor and his rangers to join their party to go in pursuit of Victorio. Baylor consented, and when the two parties got together the Mexicans wanted him to take full charge of the expedition. Baylor, however, objected that, they being on Mexican soil, a Mexican ought to command, whereupon an old pioneer Mexican, Francisco Escajeda, was made leader, and Baylor served as second in command. Nothing came of the expedition, however, for, upon scouring the neighborhood of the raid, it was found that the Apaches had crossed over again into New Mexico, and could not be located. Thirty-two bodies of the Mexicans were found and buried. A number of saddles were also found.

Another expedition into Mexico that came to naught for the Americans, soon followed. In the meantime Baylor had been made captain of company A, Texas rangers. With 20 rangers under his command, Baylor joined Colonel Joaquin Terrazas, an old Indian fighter, in Chihuahua. The United States army sent Lieutenant Parker with 68 Chiricauhua Indian scouts also to join Terrazas, and 20 black soldiers under Lieutenant Manney, to aid in the campaign against the Apaches. After following the trail of the Apaches for some time, they succeeded in locating them, but the Mexicans became uneasy because of the presence of the Chiricauhua Indians in the party and expressed the fear that they would side with Victorio should he make a good showing in a fight. "For they are relatives," said the Mexicans. On the other hand, they argued if Victorio is defeated the Chiricauhua Indians would want all the saddles. For these and probably other reasons, Terrazas announced that he had orders not to allow the Americans to remain on Mexican soil, and so the rangers and the United States troops withdrew. Terrazas and his Mexicans, however, met Victorio at Tres Castillos, and after a hard fight killed a great number of them, nearly annihilating the band.

The final extermination of Victorio's band came about as the result of the Apaches attacking a stage in Whitman canyon, killing the driver, whose name was Morgan, and a passenger named Crenshaw. Baylor went to the scene with 15 men and took up the trail of the Indians. He followed them three days into Mexico and then back again into the United States. He then telegraphed to Lieutenant Charles Nevell, who afterwards served as sheriff of El Paso county, and Nevell met him with 10 men at Eagle Springs. The joint party again took up the trail, and overtook the Indians on January 27, 1881, at daybreak, in the Devil mountains. A bloody fight ensued, in which all of the Indians either were killed or wounded. An Indian woman and two children, a boy and a girl, were captured. This was the last Indian raid in Texas, and was the end of Victorio's band.

Baylor was then placed in command of the Texas rangers, with the rank of major, in command of a battalion to put down fence-cutting during the trouble which resulted from this practice. He saw active service in that capacity, making a raid on an organized band in Nolan county which resulted in nine arrests.

Later life 
After this his active fighting service ended. He was afterwards elected from El Paso, where he had lived for many years and was well known, to serve in the Texas House of Representatives, and was a prominent member in the House. He also served as clerk of the district and circuit courts for some years. At some point Baylor left El Paso, and went to Guadalajara, Mexico, which was his home prior to the Madero revolution, and where, except for visits to the United States and short residence in El Paso, he lived until ordered to leave the country by President Wilson. While living in El Paso and after he went to Mexico, he was a frequent contributor of early reminiscences of the border to the El Paso Herald. He died at San Antonio on March 24, 1916, aged 83 years. He was interred in the Confederate Cemetery in San Antonio.

Gallery

Notes

References

Sources 

 Cutrer, Thomas W. (January 31, 2017). "Baylor, George Wythe". Handbook of Texas. Texas State Historical Association. Retrieved March 18, 2023.
 Daniell, L. E. (1887). Personnel of the Texas State Government, XXth Legislature. Austin: Press of the City Printing Company. pp. 104–106.
 "Col. George Baylor Pioneer, Is Dead". El Paso Herald. April 1–2, 1916. p. 7, col. 3.
 "George W. Baylor". Texas Ranger Hall of Fame and Museum. Retrieved March 18, 2023.

Further reading 

 Bailey, Anne J. (1989). Between the Enemy and Texas: Parsons's Texas Cavalry in the Civil War. Fort Worth: Texas Christian University Press.
 Selcer, Richard F. (December 31, 2019). "In the Confederacy's Last Days, Two Texans Face Off in Futile Feud". HistoryNet. Retrieved March 18, 2023.
 Waller, John L. (1943). "Colonel George Wythe Baylor". The Southwestern Social Science Quarterly, 24(1). pp. 23–35.
 Webb, Walter Prescott (1993). The Texas Rangers: A Century of Frontier Defense. 2nd ed. Austin: University of Texas Press. pp. 395–406, 408, 444, 454.
 Wooten, Dudley G., ed. (1898). A Comprehensive History of Texas, 1685 to 1897. Vol. 2. Dallas: William G. Scarff. pp. 614, 737.
 Wright, Marcus J.; Simpson, Harold B. (1965). Texas in the War, 1861–1865. Hillsboro: Hill Junior College Press.
 "Governmental". Austin Weekly Statesman. December 30, 1886. p. 6, cols. 3–4.
 "Indian Fighter Is Called to Reward / Col. G.W. Baylor, Veteran of Many Battles, Is Dead". San Antonio Express. March 28, 1916. p. 10.

External links 

 "Col George Wythe Baylor". Find a Grave. May 24, 2001. Retrieved March 18, 2023.
 "Gen. Johnston's Senior Aide-de-Camp Murders Confederate General". Shiloh National Military Park. Facebook. May 20, 2015. Retrieved March 18, 2023.
 "George Wythe Baylor". Legislative Reference Library of Texas. Retrieved March 18, 2023.
 "George Wythe Baylor (1832–1916)". The Latin Library. Retrieved March 18, 2023.

1832 births
1916 deaths
Confederate States Army officers
Members of the Texas Ranger Division
Democratic Party members of the Texas House of Representatives